The 6th Lambda Literary Awards were held in 1994, to honour works of LGBT literature published in 1993.

Special awards

Nominees and winners

External links
 6th Lambda Literary Awards

06
Lambda
Lists of LGBT-related award winners and nominees
1994 in LGBT history
1994 awards in the United States